Maulsinga is a village situated adjacent to Butupali. This village is very close to Boudh town and comes under Harbhanga block. It is located on the side of road connecting Charichak, Purunakatak, Butupali, and Boudh town.

As the name suggests the name of the village is given after goddess Mauli. This village has a school. People of this villagers are farmer, fisherman, and daily workers. Some are also employed in the government and private sector jobs.

External links
 Maulsinga School
 Area of Maulsinga

Villages in Boudh district